Dachniki (Cottage People) is the third studio album by the Russian band Leningrad.

Track listing
"Дачники" - Dachniki (Cottage People) – 2:10
"СКА" - SKA – 1:47
"Когда нет денег" - Kogda net deneg (When there is no money) – 2:59
"Руки из карманов" - Ruki iz karmanov (Hands Out of Pockets) – 1:33
"Колбаса-любовь" - Kolbasa-lyubov (Sausage Love) – 1:18
"Хуй в пальто" - Khuy v palto (Cock in a Coat) – 2:58
"Космос" - Kosmos (Cosmos) – 1:41
"007" – 2:10
"Инструментал" - Instrumental – 2:06
"День рождения" - Den rozhdeniya (Birthday) – 1:27
"Я И.О.Б.Г." - Ya I.O.B.G. – 1:39
"Блюз" - Blyuz (Blues) – 3:07
"Группа крови" - Gruppa krovi (Blood type) – 3:28
"Прогноз погоды" - Prognoz pogody (Weather Forecast) – 2:16
"Ну, погоди!" - Nu, pogodi! (Watch Out!) – 1:39
"Терминатор"- Terminator – 2:55
"Всё это РЕЙВ" - Vsyo eto REYV (It's All a Rave) – 3:25

External links
Album available for download from the official Leningrad website

2000 albums
Leningrad (band) albums